Harku Parish is a rural municipality in Harju County, northern Estonia, located west and neighbouring the capital Tallinn.

The administrative centre of Harku Parish is Tabasalu a small borough with population of 3,845.

Local government
The current mayor of Harku Parish is Erik Sandla from the Union of Pro Patria and Res Publica. Current chairman of the council is Kalle Palling MP.

Religion

Geography

Populated places
There are 2 small boroughs (sg. - ) and 21 villages (sg. - ) in Harku Parish.

Small boroughs: Harku, Tabasalu.

Villages: Adra, Harkujärve, Humala, Ilmandu, Kumna, Kütke, Laabi, Liikva, Muraste, Naage, Rannamõisa, Sõrve, Suurupi, Tiskre, Türisalu, Tutermaa, Vääna, Vääna-Jõesuu, Vahi, Vaila, Viti.

References

External links
Official website 
Map of Harku Parish

 
Municipalities of Estonia